The North Solomon Islands form a geographical area covering the more northerly group of islands in the Solomon Islands (archipelago) and includes Bougainville and Buka Islands, Choiseul, Santa Isabel, the Shortland Islands and Ontong Java Atoll. In 1885 Germany declared a protectorate over these islands forming the German Solomon Islands Protectorate. With the exception of Bougainville and Buka, these were transferred to the British Solomon Islands Protectorate in 1900. Bougainville and Buka continued under German administration until the outset of World War I, when they were transferred to Australia, and after the war, were formally passed to Australian jurisdiction under a League of Nations mandate.

Today, what were the North Solomon Islands are split between the Autonomous Region of Bougainville (Papua New Guinea) and the sovereign state of Solomon Islands. The latter gained independence in 1976 and succeeded the British Solomon Islands Protectorate known for decades before 1975 as the British Solomon Islands.

History 

On 17 February 1568, the Spanish explorer Alvaro de Mendaña y Neyra became the first European to sight the island, naming them Islas de Salomon.

In April 1885 a German protectorate (Schutzgebiet) was declared over the northern Solomon Islands: Bougainville, Buka, Choiseul, Santa Isabel and Ontong Java Atoll.

In 1893 the British declared a protectorate over the southern Solomon Islands of New Georgia, Guadalcanal, Malaita and San Cristobal, and this protectorate became known as the British Solomon Islands Protectorate. In 1898 Britain annexed the Santa Cruz and the Rennell and Bellona Islands.

In the year 1900, under the terms of Treaty of Berlin (14 November 1899), Germany transferred Choiseul, Santa Isabel, the Shortlands and Ontong Java Atoll Islands to the British Solomon Islands Protectorate, but retained Bougainville and its surrounding islands. Germany granted this claim in exchange for the British giving up all claims to Samoa.

Missions 

The Roman Catholic Apostolic prefecture of the Northern Solomon Islands was established on 23 May 1898, by separation from the Apostolic Vicariate of New Pomerania, including the Islands of Ysabel, Choiseul, Bougainville and all the islets under German protectorate; until 1904, it was named Apostolic Prefecture of German Solomon Islands.

In 1897 the islands were put under the jurisdiction of Mgr Broyer, Apostolic Vicar of Samoa, and in 1898 formed into a new prefecture under Mgr Joseph Forestier, who resided at Kieta, on Bougainville Island. Fever was so prevalent at the mission that most of the fathers who went to the islands in 1898 were carried off by disease.

In 1911 the mission contained: 3 churches; 3 stations; 10 Marist Fathers; 5 lay brothers; 7 sisters of the Third Order of Mary; 2 Samoan catechists; 5 Catholic schools, with 140 pupils; 2 orphanages; and a few hundred Catholics. The Marist missionaries belonged to the Province of Oceania, the superior of which resided at Sydney, New South Wales.

In 1930, it was promoted to Apostolic Vicariate of Northern Solomon Islands, from which the present Roman Catholic Diocese of Bougainville stems.

References

External links 
 World Statesmen – Solomon Islands
 GigaCatholic

Solomon Islands (archipelago)
Former colonies in Oceania
Former German colonies
History of the Solomon Islands
History of Papua New Guinea
Geography of Melanesia
Geography of the Autonomous Region of Bougainville
Archipelagoes of Papua New Guinea
1885 establishments in German New Guinea
1900 disestablishments in Germany
1885 establishments in Oceania
1900 disestablishments in Oceania
Former protectorates